Bence Szabó (born 13 June 1962, in Budapest) is a Hungarian sabre fencer, who has won four Olympic medals in the sabre competitions.

Awards
 Hungarian fencer of the Year (4): 1989, 1992, 1993, 1994
 Honorary Citizen of Újpest (2014)
 Member of International Fencing Federation (FIE) Hall of Fame (2016)

Orders and special awards
  Golden ring of the Interior minister (1988)
  Hungarian People's Republic – Order of Stars (1988)
   Order of Merit of the Republic of Hungary – Officer's Cross (1992)
   Order of Merit of the Republic of Hungary – Commander's Cross (1996)

References

External links
Profile

1962 births
Living people
Hungarian male sabre fencers
Fencers at the 1988 Summer Olympics
Fencers at the 1992 Summer Olympics
Fencers at the 1996 Summer Olympics
Olympic fencers of Hungary
Olympic gold medalists for Hungary
Olympic silver medalists for Hungary
Olympic medalists in fencing
People from Békéscsaba
Medalists at the 1988 Summer Olympics
Medalists at the 1992 Summer Olympics
Medalists at the 1996 Summer Olympics
Universiade medalists in fencing
Universiade gold medalists for Hungary
Medalists at the 1987 Summer Universiade
Medalists at the 1989 Summer Universiade
Sportspeople from Békés County
20th-century Hungarian people
21st-century Hungarian people